Stephen Pate (born 25 January 1964 in Melbourne, Victoria) is an internationally competitive cyclist and former Olympian. After turning pro in 1986, Pate won three world pro medals and set as many world pro records for 200m, 500m, and 1 km. In 1991, he won a bronze medal at the World Professional Championship at Stuttgart. However, he and his fellow Australian Carey Hall later tested positive for steroids and were stripped of their medals.

References

1964 births
Living people
Australian male cyclists
Cyclists from Melbourne
Doping cases in Australian cycling
UCI Track Cycling World Champions (men)
Australian track cyclists